Sunderwati Mahila College, also known as S.M. College, established in 1949, is one of the oldest women's colleges in Bhagalpur, Bihar. It was started in the premises of Mokshada Girls School and was later shifted to its own campus located on the banks of river Ganges. It  is affiliated to Tilka Manjhi Bhagalpur University, and offers undergraduate and postgraduate courses in science and arts.

Principals 
Past presidents of the college:
 Sharda Vedalankar (Founding Principal): 13-08-1949 to 20-08-1975; 29-09-1978 to 28-02-1981
 Grace Prasad: 26-04-1976 to 11-05-1978
 Anindita Mukherjee: 12-05-1978 to 28-09-1978
 Madhuri Sinha: 15-02-1993 to 21-01-1996
 Meena Rani: 22-01-1996 to 19-07-2002
 Nisha Rai: 15-06-2004 to 03-11-2008
 Ram Dayal Singh: 01-12-2008 to 28.02.2010
 Nisha Rai: 07.08.2010 to 10.06.2013
 Meena Rani: 01-11-2014 to unspecified period
 Archana Thakur 01-08-2017 to 30-06-2020
 Raman Sinha (at present)

Departments

Science

Chemistry
Physics
Mathematics
Zoology
Botany

Arts and Commerce

 English
Hindi
Urdu
Sanskrit
 Maithili
 Persian
Geography
Economics
Political Science
Sociology
Philosophy
Psychology
History
Music and Fine Arts
Accountancy
Mass Communication
Business Administration

References

External links
 

Colleges affiliated to Tilka Manjhi Bhagalpur University
Education in Bhagalpur district
Educational institutions established in 1949
1949 establishments in India